Pardon My French is a collective of four French DJs composed of DJ Snake, Tchami, Mercer and Malaa created in 2015. The goal of this collective is to promote electronic music in the world, but also to bring together French artists to share their passion for music.

Members

DJ Snake 

DJ Snake released his 1st album on August 5, 2016 and went platinum in less than a month. He headlined the Olympia in February 2016, then the Zenith on November 25, 2016, and the AccorHotels Arena on February 24, 2018. He says:

Tchami 

Tchami released his single  After Life , from his first EP of the same name, on December 22, 2015. At the end of the year, he founded the label Confession. Tchami stood out by creating many remixes and original productions that put him in the DJ Mag Top 100, in 62nd place in 2015. He returned in the DJ Mag Top 100 in 2017, at 95th Place. He returned to France for a concert at the Olympia on 1 December 2016, with Malaa, who makes his first part of his set. He says:

Mercer 

Mercer has released several titles on the Dutch label Spinnin' Records, and collaborated with DJ Snake on the track' 'Lunatic' '. In 2018, he released Satisfy featuring Ron Carroll. He says:

Malaa 

Malaa is the mysterious, hooded character of Pardon My French. The Parisian DJ and producer is regarded as part of the new wave of house music. Malaa has released remixes on songs by DJ Snake and Tchami.

Merchandise 
In 2016, the members of this collective decided to create their brand of clothing. Pardon My French products are marketed on the official online store. The brand has punctually ephemeral shops, during an event of one or more artists, lasting a day or two days, worldwide. In Paris, DJ Snake opens the first boutique, located on the Quai de la Mégisserie, on the weekend of July 22 and 23, 2017. A second boutique, opened on February 23, 2018 at the Léon Beaubourg space, to present the new collection spring-summer 2018. On February 24, the Levi's brand joins forces with this brand for a limited collection.

Pardon My French Tour 
In 2016, DJ Snake announces that he will have a tour of the United States Pardon My French Tour tour, with Tchami, Mercer and Malaa, at six locations. He added two more dates on December 28 and 29. In 2017, DJ Snake announces three "limited edition" dates for Pardon My French in Ibiza with Tchami, Mercer and Malaa, including two in July and one in August. He also announces five other dates in Cap d'Agde, whose members organize their own evening. He adds Martin Solveig, Aazar and Dombresky in this collective, the time of an evening, to promote French music. In 2019, DJ Snake announces a date of Pardon My French at Red Rocks Amphitheater.

Dates 
 2016
 8 April, at Chicago
 9 April, at Detroit
 15 April, at Dallas
 22 April, at Philadelphia
 23 April, at Washington
 30 April, at San Francisco
 28 December, at New York
 29 December, at Los Angeles

 2017
 5 July, at Ibiza
 12 July, at Ibiza
 31 July, at Cap d'Agde (Martin Solveig)
 7 August, at Cap d'Agde (Malaa and Mercer)
 14 August, at Cap d'Agde (DJ Snake)
 21 August, at Cap d'Agde (Tchami)
 28 August, at Cap d'Agde (Aazar and Dombresky)
 30 August, at Ibiza

 2019
 26 April, at Red Rocks Amphitheatre

References 

Collectives
French DJs